Neotinea lactea, the  milky orchid, is a species of orchid found in Europe from France to Turkey and in two North African countries: Algeria and Tunisia. Its flowers are pale to light pink, reflecting its Latin root lacteus (milky).

The species were first described in 1798 by Poiret from Algeria.

Description 
Neotinea lactea is a robust polycarpic geophyte of 10 to 25 cm high when flowering. The flower stem has a round cross-section with a rosette of 4 to 6 leaves at the base and is slightly ribbed at the top, with several smaller leaves sheathing the stem higher up. The many small flowers form a dense cluster of up to 7 cm long and oval or cylindrical in shape.

Habitat 
Neotinea lactea prefers a dry calcareous soil with full sun to semi-shaded light. Plants can be found up to 1800 m elevation on calcareous grasslands, abandoned olive orchards, exposed locations in a garrigue and open forests.

References 

 , 1998.: Les Orchidées de France, Belgique et Luxembourg, Collection Parthenope, ISBN 2-9510379-1-0
 , 1994.:Guide des orchidées d'Europe, d'Afrique du Nord et du Proche-Orient, Delachaux et Niestlé, ISBN 2-603-01323-8

External links 
 

Orchideae
Orchids of Europe